Tubul Formation is an Early Pleistocene (formerly described as Middle Pliocene in 1968 and Late Pliocene in 1976) sedimentary formation located in Arauco Province in south–central Chile. Its sediments were deposited in marine conditions. It overlies unconformably the folded sedimentary formations of Ranquil (Miocene–Pliocene), Quiriquina (Late Cretaceous) and the Lebu Group (Paleocene-Eocene).

Mollusc fossils found in the formation derives from soft-bed environments (contrary to rocky coasts). Evidence from the fossil mollusc fauna of the Tubul Formation seem to indicate that local water temperatures were lower in the Pliocene than today. Waters and mollusc faunas of Magallanes Region are modern-day equivalents of Tubul Formation.

The formation was first defined by Egidio Feruglio in 1949.

See also 
 Arauco Peninsula
 Arauco Basin
 Cerro Ballena

References

Further reading 
  S. N. Nielson and C. Valdovinos. 2008. Early Pleistocene mollusks of the Tubul Formation, south-central Chile. The Nautilus 122(4):201-216

Geologic formations of Chile
Pleistocene Chile
Sandstone formations
Siltstone formations
Shallow marine deposits
Geology of Biobío Region